Hispanic and Latin American Australians refers to Australian persons who are of Hispanic, and/or Latin American origin irrespective of their ancestral backgrounds, and their descendants. Brazilian Australians make up the largest proportion of Hispanic and/or Latin American Australians, followed by Chilean Australians and Salvadoran Australians. Most Hispanic and Latin American Australians speak English but many continue to use Spanish or Portuguese as well.

At the 2006 Census 86,156 Australian residents declared that they were born in South America (69,157), Central America (12,959) or the Caribbean (4,040).  They constitute only 0.43% of the Australian population. 93,795 residents declared themselves being of South American, Central American or Caribbean ancestry (either alone or in combination with one other ancestry).  
 
Until 2006, Chile was the country that had contributed the largest proportion of immigrants to Australia. In the 2006 Census 23,305 Australian residents declared they were born in Chile. Other Hispanic or Latin American countries include El Salvador (18,000), Spain (12,276), Argentina (11,369), Uruguay (9,376), Brazil (6,647), Peru (6,322), Colombia (5,706), and Ecuador (1,356). But in the 2011 Census, Brazil became the largest source of immigrants of Hispanic or Latin American origin in Australia, with a total of 14,509 Brazil-born people living in the country, leaving Chile in second place.

Cultural backgrounds

Within the Hispanic and Latin American minority, there are people of different national and ethnic origins. Physical appearances vary widely and often show the blending of European, Amerindian, and African features that has occurred over many generations. Most Central Americans, as are other Hipanic or Latin Americans, are mestizos. Mestizos have both European and American Indian ancestors and, in some cases, African ancestors as well. Their European ancestors were mostly Spaniards. Most Spaniards possess typical Mediterranean features - olive skin, dark hair and eyes. Their Indian ancestors were living in what is now Latin America when the Spaniards arrived.

Argentines 
Most Argentines are of Spanish and/or Italian descent, though other ethnic groups such as the British, Eastern Europeans, Arabs, Mestizos/Morochos (Argentine equivalent of mixed people), Jews ,Mulattoes and Asians also immigrated to Argentina.

Brazilians 
Most Brazilians are mostly Portuguese, Lebanese, Pardo, Italian, German, Arab, Amerindian and East Asian. Most of the African ancestors were brought as slaves to the region while it was in Portuguese control.

Colombians 
Most Colombians are of Mestizo, Spanish, German, Italian, French, Lebanese, Jew and Arab descent, while some Colombians are pure African or mixed Spanish and African descent (known as mulattoes) with their African ancestors having been brought over by the Spaniards to work as slaves.

Mexicans 
Most Mexicans are Mestizos, Indigenous and of Spanish descent, with other minorities groups such as Lebanese, French, Germans and Africans (these settled on the Pacific coast).

Chileans 
Most Chileans are mestizos and of Spanish descent, and other ethnic groups such as the British, Germans, Eastern Europeans, Jews, Arabs, and Asians also immigrated to Chile, and native settlers Mapuche and Rapa Nui (from Chilean Pacific territory of Easter Island).

Peruvians 
Most Peruvians are mestizos, Indigenous and of Spanish descent, with other minorities groups such as Italians, Germans, Asians (Chinese and Japanese), and Arabs. 

Many other Hispanics and Latin Americans are pure-blooded descendants of Spanish settlers, both colonial and post-independence (with majority are Cubans, and Puerto Ricans; Portuguese in case of Brazil). 
Many Mexicans and other Hispanics from Central America (Guatemala, El Salvador, Honduras, Panama) to South America (Bolivia, Ecuador, Peru) are pure-blooded Indigenous.

Distribution
Sydney is home to the largest proportion of Hispanic and Latin American Australians - 66% of Uruguay-born, 62% of Peru-born, 47% each of Chile-born and Colombia-born, and 42% of Brazilian-born respondents at the 2006 Census were residing in Sydney.  Persons from El Salvador however have different settlement patterns - only 18% were residing in Sydney, while 32% were in Melbourne and 21% were in Brisbane.

As of 2019, there are approximately 7,420 Mexican-born people living in Australia.

Culture

Cuisine

Food is one area in which the Hispanic world has influenced cuisine in Australia. Mexican foods are especially popular. The taco, a folded tortilla filled with meat, cheese and other ingredients. Other Hispanic dishes, such as enchiladas, tamales, tostadas and empanadas are also served in many Hispanic-themed restaurants.

Notable Hispanic and Latin American Australians 

There have been many distinguished Hispanic and Latin American Australians, in sports, the arts, politics and other areas. These include:

Film and Television
Alyssa Alano, actress and model (Spanish biological father)
Jacob Elordi, actor (Spanish descent)
 Adam Garcia (actor)
 Nathalie Kelley (actress)
 Miguel Maestre, restaurateur and television presenter - co-host lifestyle television series The Living Room
 Glenn McMillan (actor)
 Pia Miller (actress, model and presenter)
 Elsa Pataky, actress
 Nathalia Ramos, actress
 Lyndsey Rodrigues (television host)
 Adriana Xenides (former game show host)
Music
 Maya Jupiter (musician)
 Styalz Fuego (producer)
 Holly Valance, (singer)
Other
 Rosendo Salvado, abbot of New Norcia

Sport
 Peggy Antonio (cricketer)
 Mariafe Artacho del Solar (Olympic volleyballer)
 Carlos Blanco (rugby union player)
 Raul Blanco (soccer coach)
 Alex Brosque (soccer player)
 Adrian Caceres (soccer player)
 Nick Carle (soccer player)
 Josh Cordoba (rugby league player)
 Juan Manuel Fuentes (cyclist)
 Richard Garcia (soccer player) 
 Hector Lombard (Mixed Martial Arts fighter) 
 Héritier Lumumba (Australian rules footballer)
 Gabriel Mendez (soccer player)  
 Alex de Minaur (tennis player) 
 Reinaldo (soccer player) 
 Jose Romero (Australian rules footballer)
 Isaías Sánchez (soccer player and captain of Adelaide United in the A-League from 2017 to 2019)
 Dion Valle (soccer player)
 Rodrigo Vargas (soccer player)

See also

 African Australians
 American Australians
 Argentine Australians
 Brazilian Australians
 Chilean Australians
 Colombian Australians
 Demography of Australia
 European Australians
 Europeans in Oceania
 Hispanic diaspora
 Immigration to Australia
 Peruvian Australians
 Salvadoran Australians
 Spanish Australians
 Uruguayan Australians
 Mexican Australians

References

+